Joseph Olds Gregg (January 5, 1841 - February 25, 1930) was a Union Army soldier in the American Civil War who received the U.S. military's highest decoration, the Medal of Honor.

Gregg was born in Lithopolis, Ohio on January 5, 1841. He was awarded the Medal of Honor, for extraordinary heroism shown on June 16, 1864, while serving as a Private with Company F, 133rd Ohio Infantry, near the Richmond and Petersburg Ry., Virginia. His Medal of Honor was issued on May 13, 1899.

Gregg died at the age of 89, on February 25, 1930, and was buried at Lithopolis Cemetery in Lithopolis, Ohio.

Medal of Honor citation

References

External links

1841 births
1930 deaths
Burials in Ohio
People of Ohio in the American Civil War
Union Army soldiers
United States Army Medal of Honor recipients
American Civil War recipients of the Medal of Honor
People from Lithopolis, Ohio